The sixth season of the Sgt. Frog anime series consists of the fifty-one episodes after episode two-hundred-and-fifty-six from the series, which first aired in Japan from April 4, 2009 to March 27, 2010 on TV Tokyo. Season 6 uses 3 songs: 1 Opening and 2 Endings.  by the Keroro Platoon is used as the opening from episode 257 onwards.  by Yoshio Kojima is used as the ending from episode 257 to 282.  by JAM Project is used as Ending from episode 283 onwards.


Episode list

References

External links
  6th season episodes
  Keroro Gunsō schedule - Sunrise

2009 Japanese television seasons
2010 Japanese television seasons
Season 6